Andreas Erm (born 12 March 1976, in Berlin (East)) is a former German race walker.

At the 1995 European Athletics Junior Championships Erm won the Men's 10 kilometres walk aged 19. Almost one year later at the 1996 Olympic Summer Games in Atlanta, he started in the Men's 20 kilometres walk where he placed 24th. Next year, in the European Athletics U23 Championships he came in 5th over the same distance.

In the 1998 European Athletics Championships he placed 4th in the Men's 20 kilometres walk. At the 2000 European Race Walking Cup held in Germany Erm came in 2nd in the same discipline. Later that year, at the 2000 Olympic Summer Games in Sydney he placed 5th at the end, again over the same distance.

At the 2001 European Race Walking Cup Erm placed 3rd in the Men's 20 kilometres walk, a success he could repeat at the 2003 World Championships in Athletics in the more challenging Men's 50 kilometres walk.
At the 2004 Olympic Summer Games in Athens, he had been disqualified for improper walking 30 km in the Men's 50 kilometres walk while at a good 5th position.

Since his start at the Olympic Games in Athens Mr. Erm did suffer from an, at first incorrectly diagnosed, injury to the hips which also affected the muscles. Further health problems afterwards brought along setbacks in training and competition. On 10 June 2008 Andreas Erm announced the end of his active career at the age of 32.

Achievements

External links

References

1976 births
Living people
German male racewalkers
Athletes (track and field) at the 1996 Summer Olympics
Athletes (track and field) at the 2000 Summer Olympics
Athletes (track and field) at the 2004 Summer Olympics
Olympic athletes of Germany
Athletes from Berlin
World Athletics Championships medalists